SFS may refer to:

Places 
 Subic Bay International Airport (IATA airport code: SFS), Subic Bay Freeport Zone, Morong, Bataan, Olongapo, Central Luzon, Luzon, Philippines

Computers 
 SAN file system
 Self-certifying File System, a decentralized network file system
 Smart File System, a journaling filesystem used on Amiga computers
 SquashFS, a compressed file system for Linux operating systems
 Simple Features, an OpenGIS standard for storage of geographical data

Education 
 Saint Francis School Deoghar, English-medium convent school in Jharkhand, India
 Seoul Foreign School, English language school in Seoul, South Korea
 Sidwell Friends School, private Quaker school in Washington DC
 The School for Field Studies, the USA's oldest and largest undergraduate environmental study abroad program
 Edmund A. Walsh School of Foreign Service, a school of international relations within Georgetown University
 Swedish National Union of Students

Sports 
 Sioux Falls Skyforce, a basketball team from Sioux Falls, South Dakota
 Sydney Football Stadium (1988), demolished Australian stadium
 Sydney Football Stadium (2022), Australian stadium

Companies and organizations 
 San Francisco Symphony
 SFS Group, Swiss fastener manufacturer
 Finnish Standards Association

Other 
 Swedish Code of Statutes (Svensk författningssamling)
 Effluent sewer or solids-free sewer

See also

 
 SF (disambiguation) for the singular of SFs